Lilo or LILO may refer to:


People
 Lilo (name), a list of people with the nickname or surname
 Lilo (footballer), Brazilian footballer Murilo Rufino Barbosa (born 1983)
 Lilo (actress), stage name of German-born French actress and singer Liselotte Johanna Lewin (1921-2022)

LILO
 LILO (boot loader), Linux loader, a piece of low-level software
 Last in, last out, or first in, first out in queues
 Left-in/left-out, a roadway intersection

Other uses
 Lilo Pelekai, a titular character in the 2002 Disney film Lilo & Stitch and its franchise
 Air mattress or lilo, from the trademark Li-Lo

See also
 Didi Lilo, a village near Tbilisi, Georgia
 Lillo (disambiguation)
 Liloy, Zamboanga del Norte, Philippines